Gardner Robert Withrow (October 5, 1892 – September 23, 1964) was a member of the United States House of Representatives from 1931 to 1939 and again from 1949 to 1961, when he did not seek reelection. Withrow was born in La Crosse, Wisconsin, and worked for the railroad and was involved in the labor union. He was a member of the Wisconsin State Assembly. From March 4, 1931, till March 4, 1933 he represented Wisconsin's 7th congressional district in the Seventy-second as a Republican. However, for the following term he redistricted and was elected to represent Wisconsin's 3rd district. He was reelected to the following two congresses as well. A Republican at first, during the Seventy-fourth and Seventy-fifth Congresses Withrow ran as a member of Wisconsin's Progressive Party. Withrow was an unsuccessful candidate for reelection to the Seventy-Sixth Congress. He was eventually reelected to once again represent Wisconsin's third district as a Republican in the Eighty-First Congress and was reelected to the five succeeding congresses (January 3, 1949 - January 3, 1961). Withrow voted in favor of the Civil Rights Acts of 1957 and 1960. He died in La Crosse and was buried there.

Notes

External links
 

1892 births
1964 deaths
Republican Party members of the Wisconsin State Assembly
Politicians from La Crosse, Wisconsin
Wisconsin Progressives (1924)
Republican Party members of the United States House of Representatives from Wisconsin
Progressive Party (1924) members of the United States House of Representatives
20th-century American politicians